Ticarcillin/clavulanic acid, or co-ticarclav, is a combination antibiotic consisting of ticarcillin, a β-lactam antibiotic, and clavulanic acid, a β-lactamase inhibitor. This combination results in an antibiotic with an increased spectrum of action and restored efficacy against ticarcillin-resistant bacteria that produce certain β-lactamases.

References

Combination antibiotics